Thomas Mienniel (born November 24, 1980) is a retired French professional footballer who played as a centre-back.

External links
 
 

1980 births
Living people
Sportspeople from Amiens
Association football defenders
French footballers
Ligue 2 players
Amiens SC players
Tours FC players
Stade Lavallois players
Clermont Foot players
Angers SCO players
US Boulogne players
Championnat National players
Championnat National 2 players
Footballers from Hauts-de-France